The Women's aerials competition at the FIS Freestyle Ski and Snowboarding World Championships 2023 was held on 21 and 23 February 2023.

Qualification
The qualification was started on 21 February at 10:30. The twelve best skiers qualified for the final.

Final
The first run was started at 12:30 and the second run at 13:14.

References

Women's aerials